Ben Beer (born July 13, 1972) is a sailor who represented the United States Virgin Islands. He competed in the Finn event at the 2000 Summer Olympics.

References

External links
 
 

1972 births
Living people
United States Virgin Islands male sailors (sport)
Olympic sailors of the United States Virgin Islands
Sailors at the 2000 Summer Olympics – Finn
Place of birth missing (living people)